Shide (fl. 9th century) was a Tang Dynasty Chinese Buddhist poet at the Guoqing Temple on Mount Tiantai on the East China Sea coast; roughly contemporary with Hanshan and Fenggan, but younger than both of them. As close friends the three of them formed the "Tiantai Trio". Shide lived as a lay monk, and worked most of his life in the kitchen of Guoqing Temple.

An apocryphal story relates how Shide received his name: Once, Fenggan was travelling between Guoqing Temple and the village of Tiantai, when at the redstone rock ridge called 'Red Wall' (赤城) he heard some crying. He investigated, and found a ten-year-old boy who had been abandoned by his parents; and picked him up and took him back to the temple, where the monks subsequently raised him.

Shide is referred to as Jittoku in Japanese.

Poetry 
Shide wrote a number of poems, 49 of which have survived. According to Xiang Chu in his book Cold Mountain Poems and Notes, there are 57 poems attributed to Shide. Shide's poems are short; and rarely exceed 10 lines. They are typically on a Buddhist subject, and executed in a style reminiscent of Hanshan's.

See also 

 Classical Chinese poetry
 Fenggan
 Hanshan (poet)
 Hanshan Temple

References 

 Cold Mountain Poems and Notes (1997, 2000, 2010) 3rd edition, by Xiang Chu, Zhonghua Book Company, Beijing, China 
 Ci hai bian ji wei yuan hui (辞海编辑委员会）. Ci hai （辞海）. Shanghai: Shanghai ci shu chu ban she （上海辞书出版社）, 1979.
 The Collected Songs of Cold Mountain, Red Pine, Copper Canyon Press 2000,

Further reading
 Rouzer, Paul [translator], Nugent, Christopher M. B. [editor] (2017). The Poetry of Hanshan (Cold Mountain), Shide, and Fenggan . De Gruyter Mouton. 

Tang dynasty poets
Tang dynasty Buddhist monks
Writers from Taizhou, Zhejiang
9th-century Chinese poets
Poets from Zhejiang
Zenga